The John Kinzer House is a historic house in Carmel, Indiana. It was built in the 1840s by John D. Kinzer, a settler who lived here with his wife and their seven children. Kinzer purchased the land from the federal government and initially built a much more modest cabin which still stands next to the main house; the cabin was built in 1828. The main house was designed in the Federal architectural style, with two storeys and two chimneys. It has been listed on the National Register of Historic Places since September 5, 1975.

References

		
National Register of Historic Places in Hamilton County, Indiana
Federal architecture in Indiana
Houses completed in 1840